Ras Muari, often referred to as Cape Monze, is a beach located off the shore of the Arabian Sea in Karachi. It stretches from the village of Mubarak to Yousuf Goth (Pacha) in West Karachi, Sindh, Pakistan.

Geography
Ras Muari is part of a 25-kilometer coastal belt of rocky and sandy beaches between Mubarak and Yousuf Goth (Pacha). This part of the coast is property of Sindh Revenue Department. Considered a habitat for endangered whale, dolphin, and turtle species, Ras Muari is also a hatching and feeding ground for turtles. In addition, the coastline has a multitude of offshore fish nurseries.

Lighthouse
The Cape Monze lighthouse was constructed in 1914. Active; focal plane 49 m (161 ft); two white flashes every 10 s. 48 m (157 ft) round concrete tower. The seaward side of the tower is painted with black and white horizontal bands; the land side is unpainted. Original 2nd order Fresnel lens in use. Several keeper's houses and other light station buildings.

See also
List of lighthouses in Pakistan

References

External links
 Picture of Ras Muari Lighthouse

Beaches of Karachi
Lighthouses in Pakistan
Headlands of Pakistan